The Journal of Cardiac Surgery is a peer-reviewed medical journal about cardiology and surgery that was established in March 1986.

The current editor in chief of the journal is Tomas Salerno of the University of Miami.

References

External links 
 

Publications established in 1986
Wiley-Blackwell academic journals
Cardiology journals
Bimonthly journals
English-language journals
Surgery journals